Yim Junghyun (born 8 September 1987, Jeollanam) is a South Korean race walker. He competed in the 50 kilometres walk event at the 2012 Summer Olympics.  He competed in the same event in the 2011 and 2013 Athletics World Championships.

References

1987 births
Living people
South Korean male racewalkers
Olympic athletes of South Korea
Athletes (track and field) at the 2012 Summer Olympics
Athletes (track and field) at the 2010 Asian Games
World Athletics Championships athletes for South Korea
Asian Games competitors for South Korea
Sportspeople from South Jeolla Province
21st-century South Korean people